Bruce Williamson may refer to:
 Bruce D. Williamson (born 1947), American politician, Minnesota state representative
 Bruce Williamson (businessman), American energy company executive
 Bruce Williamson (politician), American politician, Georgia state representative
 Bruce Williamson (singer) (1970–2020), American R&B and soul singer
Bruce Williamson (diplomat), American diplomat
 Bruce Williamson (saxophonist) (born 1951), American jazz saxophonist

See also
 John Bruce Williamson (1859–1938), barrister, historian and writer